Encephalartos dyerianus, known colloquially as the Lillie cycad,  is a species of cycad that is native to hillsides in the lowveld of eastern Limpopo, South Africa.

Description
The stem reaches 4 m in height by 60 cm in diameter. 

The leaves are 140–170 cm long, opaque blue-silver, slightly inclined. The petiole is straight and has up to six spines. The leaflets are 17–24 cm long and 13–18 mm wide. They have toothed edges and are inserted into the leaf forming angles of 45-80°. At the base of the leaf the leaflets are reduced to thorns.

The spine is normally straight and stiff, but can sometimes be slightly twisted.

It is a dioecious species, with ovoid blue-green or yellow male cones 30–50 cm long by 9–12 cm in diameter, and blue-green or yellow ovoid female cones 30–60 cm long by 10–20 cm in diameter.

The seeds are elongated, with dimensions 40–45 mm for 25–30 mm, with a yellow or orange-brown sarcotesta.

Range and habitat
It is native to the lowveld of eastern Limpopo. It occurs on slopes of low granite hills in the Gravelotte Rocky Bushveld, in either open grassland or shrubland.

Status
It is listed under CITES Appendix I, which implies that it is "most endangered" in its natural range. Some 600 plants remained in the wild during the 1970s, but this was further reduced during 2008. In addition to illegal collecting, an application for strip mining in Selati Game Reserve is seen as a threat.

References

External links

 

dyerianus